Nikolaos Polias (born 28 March 1971) is a Greek long-distance runner. He competed in the men's marathon at the 2004 Summer Olympics.

References

1971 births
Living people
Athletes (track and field) at the 2004 Summer Olympics
Greek male long-distance runners
Greek male marathon runners
Olympic athletes of Greece
Athletes from Piraeus
21st-century Greek people